The Five Cents of Lavarede (French:Les cinq sous de Lavarède) is a 1927 French silent adventure film directed by Maurice Champreux and starring Georges Biscot, Janine Liézer and Paulette Berger.

Cast
 Georges Biscot as Armand Lavarède  
  as Miss Aurett Murlyton  
 Paulette Berger as Martine Binguett  
 Carlos Avril as Prosper Bouvreuil  
 Anna Lefeuvrier as Pénélope Bouvreuil 
 Jean-David Évremond as Jack Murlyton

References

Bibliography 
 Goble, Alan. The Complete Index to Literary Sources in Film. Walter de Gruyter, 1999.

External links 
 

1927 films
French silent films
French adventure films
1927 adventure films
1920s French-language films
Films directed by Maurice Champreux
Pathé films
French black-and-white films
Silent adventure films
1920s French films